The college football recruiting class of 2021 refers to the recruiting of high school athletes to play college football starting in the fall of 2021. The scope of this article covers: (a) the colleges and universities with recruiting classes ranking among the top 20 in the country as assessed by at least one of the major media companies, and (b) the individual recruits ranking among the top 20 in the country as assessed by at least one of the major media companies.

The Alabama Crimson Tide, led by head coach Nick Saban, had the top recruiting class according to Rivals.com, 247Sports, and On3. Ohio State was ranked second by all three services.

Media outlets disagreed over who was the nation's top recruit. Rivals.com and 247Sports selected quarterback Quinn Ewers as the No. 1 recruit. Ewers committed to Ohio State but later transferred to Texas. Defensive end Jack Sawyer was selected as the No. 1 recruit by ESPN and also committed to Ohio State. Defensive end Korey Foreman was selected as the No. 1 recruit by the USA Today and committed to USC.

Top ranked classes

Top ranked recruits

References

Recruiting class
Recruiting class